The Saint Barthélemy national football team is the official association football team of Saint Barthélemy. The association is in the process of joining the Caribbean Football Union and CONCACAF and therefore cannot yet compete in tournaments sanctioned by these organizations.

History
In 2010 Chelsea FC owner and Saint Barthélemy resident Roman Abramovich donated a reported $3 million to renovate the Stade de Saint-Jean. This allowed Saint Barthélemy to host home matches. In 2019 the Comité Territorial de Football de Saint-Barthélemy began the process of joining the Caribbean Football Union and CONCACAF for the first time.

This led to the start of the Saint Barthélemy team playing friendlies, though action was limited until they hosted friendly tournaments in 2018 and 2019. While competitive against their close neighbours, match time is still limited in comparison to members of CONCACAF. The women's team would also play in 2019, defeating Sint Maarten 5–3.

List of international matches
The following list contains all results of Saint Barthélemy's matches.

Head-to-head record
Up to matches played on 10 March 2023.

Managers
 Maxime Chevreul

Player records

Players in bold are still active with Saint Barthélemy.

References

External links
Elo Profile
Official website

 
Football in Saint Barthélemy
National football teams of Overseas France
North American national and official selection-teams not affiliated to FIFA